Valley View Island is an island bar on the South Branch Potomac River near Romney in the U.S. state of West Virginia. The island is formed at the confluence of the South Branch Potomac River with Sulphur Spring Run at the foot of Romney's Yellow Banks and takes its name from nearby Valley View Farm, an 1855 Antebellum plantation house. Valley View Island is currently private property.

See also 
List of islands of West Virginia

River islands of West Virginia
Islands of the Potomac River
Landforms of Hampshire County, West Virginia